Isaac Acuña Sánchez (born 18 August 1989) is a professional footballer who plays as a forward for Liga Nacional club Municipal. Born in the United States, he represented the Mexico national under-22 team.

Career

Club América
On April 9, 2010, Acuña made his debut for Club América against Jaguares de Chiapas coming on as a substitute in the 85th minute.  On July 13, 2011, Acuna scored on a header against Atlas in the Reto II at The Home Depot Center in Carson, Ca from a center made by Oscar Adrian Rojas and the game was eventually won by Club América 2-1.

Querétaro
On January 1, 2011, Acuña joined Querétaro on loan.
On his first game vs Santos Laguna, he scored a goal by taking out Oswaldo Sanchez and then tapping the ball in. He then went off to score a stunning goal against Cruz Azul. Against Puebla F.C. he netted a header, thus increasing his goal tally to 3 on the 2011

Honours
Guastatoya
Liga Nacional de Guatemala: Apertura 2018

Santa Lucía
Liga Nacional de Guatemala: Clausura 2021

References

External links
 
 football-lineups.com
 stats.televisadeportes.esmas.com
 

1989 births
Living people
American soccer players
Soccer players from California
American sportspeople of Mexican descent
Club América footballers
Querétaro F.C. footballers
C.F. Mérida footballers
New York Cosmos B players
New York Cosmos (2010) players
Detroit City FC players
Liga MX players
National Premier Soccer League players
National Independent Soccer Association players
Expatriate footballers in Mexico
Association football midfielders
People from Calexico, California
Deportivo Sanarate F.C. players